The tasselled wobbegong (Eucrossorhinus dasypogon) is a species of carpet shark in the family Orectolobidae and the only member of its genus. It inhabits shallow coral reefs off northern Australia, New Guinea, and adjacent islands. Reaching  in length, this species has a broad and flattened body and head. Its most distinctive trait is a fringe of branching dermal flaps around its head, which extends onto its chin. The fringe, along with its complex color pattern of small blotches and reticulations, enable it to camouflage itself against the reef environment.

During the day, the solitary tasselled wobbegong can generally be found lying inside caves or under ledges with its tail curled. Individual sharks tend to remain within a local area and have favored resting spots. While resting, it opportunistically ambushes nearby fishes and invertebrates, and also lures in prey by waving its tail to mimic the appearance of a small fish. At night, it emerges and actively forages for food. This species is aplacental viviparous, though little is known of its life history. The tasselled wobbegong has been reported to bite and kill humans unprovoked; attacks may result from people accidentally disturbing the shark or being misperceived as prey. The International Union for Conservation of Nature (IUCN) has listed this species as Near Threatened, as outside of Australia it is threatened by fisheries and habitat degradation. As of 2015, its IUCN status is Least Concern.

Taxonomy and phylogeny
Dutch ichthyologist Pieter Bleeker originally described the tasselled wobbegong in an 1867 volume of Archives Néerlandaises des Sciences Exactes et Naturelles. His account was based on two Indonesian specimens, one caught off Waigeo and the other off Aru. He gave it the name dasypogon, from the Greek dasys ("hairy") and pogon ("beard"), and assigned it to the genus Crossorhinus (a synonym of Orectolobus). In 1908, Charles Tate Regan created the new genus Eucrossorhinus for this species, derived from the Greek eu ("well"), krossoi ("tassel") and rhinos ("nose"). Regan subsequently reconsidered the main trait he used to separate Eucrossorhinus (the spacing of the fourth and fifth gill slits) and synonymized it with Orectolobus. Later authors have placed the tasselled wobbegong either in its own genus or in Orectolobus. Other common names for this species are bearded wobbegong and Ogilby's wobbegong.

Morphological studies have been inconclusive about the evolutionary relationships of the tasselled wobbegong, but overall have gauged it to be among the more derived wobbegong (Orectolobidae) species. A 2009 phylogenetic analysis based on mitochondrial and nuclear DNA found otherwise, that this species was in fact basal to all other wobbegongs except the northern wobbegong (O. wardi). This result supports the synonymization of Eucrossorhinus with Orectolobus. Molecular clock estimation placed the speciation of the tasselled wobbegong at 11–6 Ma, coinciding with a period of significant geological rearrangement and the formation of coral reef habitats in the region.

Description

The tasselled wobbegong is a very broad, moderately flattened shark. The head is wider than long, with a distinctive fringe of branching dermal lobes running almost continuously from the snout tip to the origins of the pectoral fins, including a "beard" on the chin. The nostrils bear long, branching barbels, and have grooves surrounding them and connecting them to the mouth. There are tubercles above the eyes but not elsewhere, and behind the eyes are larger spiracles. The large mouth is positioned ahead of the eyes, almost at the end of the head. There are furrows on the lower jaw extending from the mouth corners and along the jaw median. There are 23–26 upper and 19 lower tooth rows; each tooth has a single slender, pointed cusp. The three upper and two lower rows of symphysial (central) teeth are especially long and fang-like. The five pairs of gill slits are short.

The pectoral and pelvic fins are large and rounded. The dorsal fins are short-based and fairly tall; the first is slightly larger than the second and originates over the latter quarter of the pelvic fin bases. Behind the pelvic fins, the body rapidly tapers to the short caudal peduncle. The anal fin originates behind the midpoint of the second dorsal fin and is no more than half its size. The caudal fin is short, with no lower lobe and an upper lobe bearing a strong ventral notch near the tip. This species has a mosaic-like dorsal color pattern consisting of numerous small, dark blotches and lines on a gray- or yellow-brown background; there may also be darker bands. The pattern extends to the underside of the tail and the ventral pectoral and pelvic fin margins. The ventral surface is otherwise white.

Distribution and habitat
The range of the tasselled wobbegong encompasses the continental shelf of northern Australia from Ningaloo Reef in the west to Bundaberg in the east, as well as New Guinea, Waigeo, and the Aru Islands. Additional records from Malaysia are unconfirmed. It is most often encountered in reef channels and faces, or atop coral heads.

Biology and ecology

Considered the most specialized member of its family, the tasselled wobbegong's ornate coloration and complex dermal fringe grants it excellent camouflage, while it is probably a slower swimmer than related species. It is solitary and spends most of the day lying motionless inside caves or under ledges with its tail curled up. Individual sharks have a small home range, containing several preferred resting spots that are used repeatedly. This species becomes more active at night, swimming onto the reef to hunt.

The tasselled wobbegong feeds on bony and cartilaginous fishes, crustaceans, and cephalopods. During daytime, this species is an opportunistic ambush predator. It preys upon schooling nocturnal fishes such as squirrelfishes, soldierfishes, and sweepers that often shelter in the same cave. Tiny fishes and crustaceans have been seen settling atop the resting wobbegong's head, attracting larger fishes that are in turn attacked by the wobbegong. Observations in captivity have further revealed that this species seems to engage in active luring behavior. When it perceives food nearby, it begins to slowly wave its tail back and forth; its caudal fin resembles a small fish, complete with a dark eyespot at the base. The shark typically rests with its head elevated, which places it within striking distance of any prey drawn by its tail.

The tapeworm Parachristianella monomegacantha is a known parasite of the tasselled wobbegong. This species has been observed being attended by cleaner shrimp (Leander urocaridella, Stenopus hispidus) and bluestreak cleaner wrasse (Labroides dimidiatus). Reproduction is presumably aplacental viviparous like other wobbegongs, with the developing embryos sustained by yolk. There is a report of mating being observed inside a cave at night.

Human interactions
With several records of apparently unprovoked attacks on people, the tasselled wobbegong has a reputation beyond other wobbegongs for aggressive behavior. Gilbert Whitley even wrote in 1940 that it "attacks and generally kills the natives" of Papua New Guinea. Though Whitley's claim is questionable, this species is certainly capable of inflicting severe wounds. Conversely, the tasselled wobbegong is also an ecotourism attraction and many divers have approached it without incident. Given this shark's cryptic appearance and poor vision, humans should exercise caution to avoid accidentally harassing it or causing it to mistake a hand or foot for prey. This species adapts well to captivity and is occasionally found in the home aquarium trade.

The tasselled wobbegong has little economic value, though its attractive skin is occasionally used for leather. In Australian waters, it is not fished and faces minimal threats. However, elsewhere in its range it may be negatively affected by extensive fishery activity and habitat degradation from pollution, blast fishing, and coral removal. Because of these concerns, the International Union for Conservation of Nature (IUCN) has assessed this species as Least Concern.

References

External links

 "Eucrossorhinus dasypogon, Tasselled wobbegong" at FishBase
 "Biological Profiles: Tasselled Wobbegong" at Florida Museum of Natural History
 

Orectolobidae
Fish described in 1867